João Gabriel Silva Ferreira (born 29 July 1986 in Mealhada, Aveiro District), known as Barroca, is a Portuguese former professional footballer who played as a goalkeeper.

References

External links

1986 births
Living people
Sportspeople from Aveiro District
Portuguese footballers
Association football goalkeepers
Primeira Liga players
Segunda Divisão players
G.D. Tourizense players
Associação Académica de Coimbra – O.A.F. players
Swiss Super League players
Swiss Challenge League players
Servette FC players
FC Lausanne-Sport players
FC Stade Nyonnais players
FC Meyrin players
FC Stade Lausanne Ouchy players
Portuguese expatriate footballers
Expatriate footballers in Switzerland
Portuguese expatriate sportspeople in Switzerland